Andrew D. Goldstein is a prosecutor and the former chief of the public corruption unit of the United States Attorney's Office for the Southern District of New York. He was a member of the Special Counsel team, led by Special Counsel Robert Mueller, which is investigated Russian interference in the 2016 United States elections.

Early life and education
He graduated from The Pingry School in 1992 and Princeton University in 1996. He then graduated from Yale Law School.

Career
Goldstein joined the United States Attorney's Office for the Southern District of New York in 2010 and served under U.S. Attorney Preet Bharara. He worked in the office's money laundering and asset forfeiture unit. In 2013, Goldstein successfully prosecuted three men in connection with the corruption scandal involving the payroll modernization project known as CityTime. He was a prosecutor in the successful prosecutions of former state Assembly Speaker Sheldon Silver and former state Senate Majority Leader Dean Skelos for corruption. He was also involved in the investigation of New York City Mayor Bill de Blasio's fundraising.

References

External links
Andrew D. Goldstein, Note, What Feeney Got Right: Why Courts of Appeals Should Review Sentencing Departures De Novo, 113 Yale L.J. 1955 (2004)

Assistant United States Attorneys
Living people
Princeton University alumni
Yale Law School alumni
Date of birth missing (living people)
Members of the 2017 Special Counsel investigation team
Year of birth missing (living people)
Pingry School alumni
Jewish American attorneys